William Thompson Price (June 17, 1824December 6, 1886) was an American lawyer and Republican politician.  He represented Wisconsin's 8th congressional district in the United States House of Representatives from 1883 until his death, and was succeeded by his son, Hugh H. Price.  He is the namesake of Price County, Wisconsin.

Early life and 
Born in Huntingdon County, Pennsylvania, Price attended public schools. He was a clerk in a store in Hollidaysburg, Pennsylvania, and also studied law.

Career 
He moved to Mount Pleasant in the Iowa Territory in 1845, and in the following autumn moved to Black River Falls in the Wisconsin Territory. He engaged in lumbering and agricultural pursuits.
He was deputy sheriff of Crawford County in 1849. He served as member of the Wisconsin State Assembly in 1851 and again in 1882.
He was admitted to the bar in 1852 and engaged in the practice of law. In 1854, he moved to La Crosse, Wisconsin, and operated a stage line between La Crosse and Black River Falls.
He moved back to Black River Falls and continued his legal practice until 1857.
He served as judge of Jackson County in 1854 and 1859. He was sheriff of Crawford County in 1855 and County treasurer in 1856 and 1857. He served in the Wisconsin State Senate in 1857, 1870, and 1878–1881, and was president of the Senate in 1879.
He served as collector of internal revenue 1863–1865.

Price was elected as a Republican to the Forty-eighth and Forty-ninth Congresses and served from March 4, 1883, until his death in Black River Falls, Wisconsin on December 6, 1886. He was interred in Riverside Cemetery. While in congress, he represented Wisconsin's 8th congressional district. To fill the vacancy caused by his death, his son, Hugh H. Price was elected to fill his place serving until the end of the Forty-ninth Congress.

Price County, Wisconsin is named in his honor.

See also
List of United States Congress members who died in office (1790–1899)

External links

|-

1824 births
1886 deaths
People from Huntingdon County, Pennsylvania
American people of Welsh descent
Republican Party Wisconsin state senators
Republican Party members of the Wisconsin State Assembly
Wisconsin state court judges
Republican Party members of the United States House of Representatives from Wisconsin
19th-century American politicians
19th-century American judges